Alessandro Sorrentino (born 3 April 2002) is an Italian professional footballer who plays as a goalkeeper for  club Monza.

Club career

Early career 
Sorrentino started playing for Lanciano at six years old as an outfield player; he became a goalkeeper following a friendly match where he was forced to replace the team's missing goalkeeper. Despite Lanciano gaining promotion to the Serie B, they declared bankruptcy in 2016; Sorrentino left the club on a free transfer, and joined Renato Curi Angolana. After one season, he moved to Pescara's youth sector in 2017.

Pescara 
Sorrentino was first integrated to the senior team during the 2019–20 Serie B season, during which he also played as the first-choice goalkeeper in the Primavera (under-19) team, that was newly-promoted to the Campionato Primavera 1.

He made his senior debut for Pescara on 15 September 2021, starting a 2–0 Coppa Serie C home win against Grosseto. A month later, Sorrentino made his Serie C debut. He signed his first professional contract in March 2022, effectively replacing Raffaele Di Gennaro as the starting goalkeeper. Sorrentino was a key player for Pescara, playing 29 league games during the 2021–22 season.

Monza 
On 13 July 2022, Sorrentino joined newly-promoted Serie A side Monza on a five-year deal, as part of a swap deal involving Daniele Sommariva and Luca Lombardi moving the other way.

International career 
Having already represented Italy internationally at under-20 level since March 2022, Sorrentino was called by Italy national team coach Roberto Mancini in May 2022 to a training camp with Italy's most promising youth players as the only player from Serie C.

In June 2022, after having been called up to the U20 team again, Sorrentino was first selected by Paolo Nicolato to the under-21 team.

Career statistics

Club

References

External links

 Profile at A.C. Monza
 

2002 births
Living people
Sportspeople from the Province of Chieti
Footballers from Abruzzo
Italian footballers
Association football goalkeepers
S.S. Virtus Lanciano 1924 players
Delfino Pescara 1936 players
A.C. Monza players
Serie C players

Italy youth international footballers